Anke Dannowski is a German mountain bike orienteering competitor and World Champion. She won an individual gold medal at the 2004 World MTB Orienteering Championships, and a gold medal in the relay in 2005.

References

German orienteers
Female orienteers
German female cyclists
Mountain bike orienteers
Year of birth missing (living people)
Living people
Place of birth missing (living people)
Cyclists from Dresden
20th-century German women
21st-century German women